The R740 road is a regional road in Ireland which links Rosslare Strand with the N25 in County Wexford.

See also 
 Roads in Ireland
 National primary road

References 

Regional roads in the Republic of Ireland
Roads in County Wexford